Wallenstein is a 1920 historical novel by German author Alfred Döblin. Set in Central Europe during the Thirty Years War, the novel's plot is organized around the polar figures of Ferdinand II, Holy Roman Emperor, on the one hand, and Albrecht von Wallenstein, on the other. Döblin's approach to narrating the war differed from prevailing historiography in that, rather than interpreting the Thirty Years War primarily as a religious conflict, he portrays it critically as the absurd consequence of a combination of national-political, financial, and individual psychological factors.  Döblin saw a strong similarity between the Thirty Years War and the First World War, during which he wrote Wallenstein. The novel is counted among the most innovative and significant historical novels in the German literary tradition. In large part, contemporary critics found the novel to be difficult, dense, and chaotic—a reception Döblin discussed in his 1921 essay "The Epic Writer, His Material, and Criticism"—yet writers such as Lion Feuchtwanger, Franz Blei, and Herbert Ihering praised Wallenstein for its formal innovation, poetic language, epic scope, and bold departure from other German writing of the time. Despite the novel's difficulty, the critical consensus was that Wallenstein was a major achievement and confirmed the promise seen in Döblin's earlier historical novel, The Three Leaps of Wang Lun.

Notes

References

Further reading
Donahue, Neil H. "The Fall Of Wallenstein, Or The Collapse Of Narration? The Paradox Of Epic Intensity In Döblin's Wallenstein." A Companion to the Works of Alfred Döblin. 75-92. Rochester, NY: Camden House, 2003.
Hecker, Axel. Geschichte Als Fiktion. Alfred Döblins “Wallenstein” – Eine Exemplarische Kritik Des Realismus. Würzburg: Königshausen & Neumann, 1986. Print.
Hüppauf, Bernd. "The Historical Novel and a History of Mentalities: Alfred Döblin's Wallenstein as an Historical Novel." In: The Modern German Historical Novel. Ed. by David Roberts and Philip Thomson. New York and Oxford: Berg, 1991. 71-96.
Kocher, Ursula. “Totaler Krieg: Zu Alfred Döblins Roman ‘Wallenstein.’” Geschlossene Formen. Ed. Ralph Kray and Kai Luehrs-Kaiser. Würzburg: Königshausen & Neumann, 2005. 61–76. Print.
Koepke, Wulf. The Critical Reception of Alfred Döblin’s Major Novels. Rochester, NY: Camden House, 2003. Print.
Mayer, Dieter. Alfred Döblins Wallenstein. Zur Geschichtsauffassung und zur Struktur. Munich: Wilhelm Fink, 1972. Print.
Müller, Harro. “War and Novel: Alfred Döblin’s Wallenstein and November 1918.” War, Violence, and the Modern Condition. Ed. Bernd Hüppauf. Berlin, Germany: de Gruyter, 1997. 290–299. Print.
Scherpe, Klaus R. "'Ein Kolossalgemälde für Kurzsichtige.' Das Andere der Geschichte in Alfred Döblins Wallenstein." In: Geschichte als Literatur. Formen und Grenzen der Repräsentation von Vergangenheit. Ed. by Hartmut Eggert et al. Stuttgart: Metzler, 1990. 226-241.

External links
Wallenstein on Google Books: vol. 1 and vol. 2
EBook version of vol. 2 of the first edition on the University of Toronto's Internet Archive

Novels by Alfred Döblin
German historical novels
Weimar culture
1920 German novels
1920 German-language novels
Novels set in the 17th century
Cultural depictions of Albrecht von Wallenstein